Thamee Mite is a 2001 Burmese drama film directed by Khin Maung Oo & Soe Thein Htut. Htet Htet Moe acted in dual role as Mother and her daughter in this film. Htet Htet Moe Oo won the Best Actress Award in 2001 Myanmar Motion Picture Academy Awards.

Cast
Lwin Moe as Thaw Oo
Htet Htet Moe Oo in dual role as May Myat Noe and her daughter; Shwe Eain Soe
Ya Wai Aung as Khun Sett
May Than Nu as Daw May Myat, Mother of May Myat Noe
Zaw Oo as Father of May Myat Noe
Myint Myint Khine as Daw May Thi, Mother of Thaw Oo
Myat Kay Thi Aung as May Mi, Sister of Thaw Oo
Gone Pone as Phway Phway

Award

References

2001 films
2000s Burmese-language films
Burmese drama films
Films shot in Myanmar
2001 drama films